Manadu Thandupathu is an Indian village in Tuticorin district near Tiruchendur above 12 km. It is famous for 'Pathene'.

Many people have moved to nearby cities, especially to Chennai.

Temples
Manadu is home to a 1,300-year-old temple constructed during Pandya dynasty. The Chera and Pandya emblems are shown on the temple's inner wall. Seven Amman temples are used for worship by seven communities. Initially, many temples and well-developed houses resided in the area, but only two temples survive: Kaliyugavarathar Temple and Perumal temple in South Manadu. 

Esakkiamman temple and Kaliamman temple are located there.

Pankuni Uthiram is a festival celebrated across Tamil Nadu. 

Saiva Pillaimars, Nadars, Ascaris, Thevars, and Parayars are the communities.

Festivals 
Pongal, Dasara, Muniasamy Kovil (Chithirai), Amman Kovil (Thai), Manadu Sri Mariamman (Chithirai).

History
The ancient village name "Manadu Thandupathu panchayat" derives from the two villages; namely Manadu and Thandupathu.

Geography 
Manadu is situated on the state highway and runs from Tiruchendur to Nagercoil, 12 km from Tiruchendur.

Transport 
The nearest railway station is Tiruchendur (12 km). For college, students go to Tiruchendur. 

All buses that operate between Tiruchendur and Nagercoil stop in Manadu.

Amenities 
An indoor badminton stadium was built and operated by the help of the Tamil Nadu Government and local donors and well-wishers.

References

External links 

Villages in Thoothukudi district